Jamie Mueller is an American, former collegiate softball second baseman and current head coach at Wartburg College. She played college softball at Aurora.

Playing career
Mueller played softball at Aurora University for three years.  In those her time with the Spartans, they compiled a 103–25 record, won three conference titles and made one NCAA Regional.

Coaching career

Depauw
Mueller spent three seasons, beginning in 2013, as an assistant coach for Depauw University softball, under head coach Erica Hanrahan.  In those three years the Tigers saw tremedous success winning three straight North Coast Athletic Conference championships and two NCAC tournament championships.  In her final season as an assistant at Depauw, they finished with a 36–16 record and ended the season in the NCAA DIII College World Series.

Wartburg
On July 8, 2015, Mueller was named the new head coach for the Wartburg Knights softball program.  Prior to her arrival in Waverly, the Knights had failed to qualify for the IIAC/ARC conference six team postseason tournament for the past six seasons, finishing on or near the bottom of the conference standings. In her first season, the Knights qualified for the conference tournament. In just her fourth season she led the Knights back to the NCAA tournament first time since 2009 after they received an at-large bid.  Mueller's most recent season (2022) led them back to the NCAA tournament when they won the conference tournament.  Following winning the NCAA regional at Saint Benedict's College, the season would come to an end in Decatur, Illinois in the NCAA Super Regionals.

Head coaching record

References

Year of birth missing (living people)
Living people